Edward Ormondroyd (born 8 October 1925) is an American writer of children's books. He is best known for David and the Phoenix, a fantasy novel. His time travel novel Time at the Top was filmed for television in 1999.

Ormondroyd was born in Wilkinsburg, Pennsylvania, and grew up in Pennsylvania and Michigan before serving two years on a destroyer escort in World War II. He participated in the invasions of Iwo Jima and Okinawa. After the war he attended the University of California at Berkeley, earning a Bachelor's degree in English and a masters in Library Science. He lived in Berkeley for 25 years, working at various jobs while he wrote children's books. In 1970 he and his wife, Joan, moved from Berkeley to Newfield a small town west of Ithaca, New York. In 2007 he was living in Trumansburg, New York. In September 2020 it was reported that after living in Trumansburg for 30 years, Ormondroyd and his wife had moved to California to be closer to family.

Works 
Source: Loganberry Books.

David and the Phoenix, illustrated by Joan Raysor (Berkeley, CA: Parnassus Press, 1957)
The Tale of Alain, illus. Robert Frankenberg (Follett Publishing, 1960)
Time at the Top, illus. Peggie Bach (Parnassus, 1963)
Jonathan Frederick Aloysius Brown, illus. Suzi Spector Ormondroyd (San Carlos, CA: Golden Gate Junior Books, 1964)
Theodore, illus. John M. Larrecq (Parnassus, 1966)
Michael, the Upstairs Dog, illus. Cyndy Szekeres (Dial Press, 1967)
Broderick, illus. Larrecq (Parnassus, 1969)
Theodore's Rival, illus. Larrecq (Parnassus, 1971)
Castaways on Long Ago, illus. Ruth Robbins (Parnassus, 1973)
Imagination Greene, illus. John Lewis  (Parnassus, 1973)
All in Good Time, illus. Robbins (Parnassus, 1975) – sequel to Time at the Top
Johnny Castleseed, illus. Diana Thewlis (Houghton Mifflin, 1985)

References

External links

 2011 interview (part 1) at Noblemania blogspot.com (part 2) 
 
 
 
 
 

1925 births
Living people
20th-century American male writers
20th-century American novelists
American children's writers
American male novelists
People from Wilkinsburg, Pennsylvania
People from Tompkins County, New York
People from Trumansburg, New York
Military personnel from Pennsylvania
Novelists from New York (state)
Novelists from Pennsylvania
United States Navy personnel of World War II
University of California, Berkeley alumni